Westfall High School is a public high school near Williamsport, Ohio, United States.  It is the only high school in the Westfall Local School District. The Westfall Local School District coverage area is mostly rural, and includes all or portions of six townships situated in the western part of Pickaway County.

Athletics

Ohio High School Athletic Association State Championships 

 Girls Softball - 2014

References

External links
  Westfall High School website

High schools in Pickaway County, Ohio
Public high schools in Ohio